Heavy is an American documentary series that airs on A&E. The series chronicles the weight loss efforts of people suffering from severe obesity. It ran for one season, from January 17 to April 4, 2011.

Overview 
Each 60-minute episode chronicles six months in the lives of two people who are facing life-threatening health consequences as a result of their obesity. In episodes 1 through 5, the individuals are sent to a fitness camp in Texas for the first month, undergoing a strict program of diet and exercise and learning to change their attitudes about food. For the remaining five months they continue to lose weight at home, with the help of personal trainers, but can be called back to the camp if periodic weigh-ins reveal that they are not making progress. There are no weigh-ins during the sixth month except for the last day, with the goal of encouraging the participants to make the transition back to daily life outside of the weight loss program.

Starting with episode 6, the two individuals spend the entire six months at a fitness camp on Hilton Head Island, South Carolina. Episode 12 was a revisit to some of the Texas participants.

Episode list

Season 1: 2011

References

External links 
 Heavy page at A&E Television site

2011 American television series debuts
2011 American television series endings
2010s American reality television series
2010s American documentary television series
A&E (TV network) original programming
English-language television shows
Fitness reality television series